The John Sebastian Light Vessel 55 is a former lightvessel that now acts as an event venue in Bathurst Basin, Bristol, England. It is the last remaining wooden lightship afloat in the world.

History 
The ship was built in 1885 by Charles Hill & Son in the Albion Dry Dock in Bristol harbour, where the SS Great Britain was also built. The ship was never given an engine, resulted in it being eventually towed to Bathurst Basin. Parts of the ship ended up being sold including the lantern. The ship was set alight and burned for days. When the fire stopped, the ship did not succumb to the fire and remained in the dock as a wreck.

Cabot Cruising Club purchased the ship in 1954 for £275. They rebuilt the ship into an event location with a bar for their club to host socialising events.

The ship was opened in 1959 and named 'John Sebastian' after the Bristol sailor John Sebastian.

Cabot Cruising Club 
Cabot Cruising Club is a Bristol boating club founded in 1937. The club has been active for over 80 years and hosts most of their sessions at the John Sebastian Light Vessel. Cabot Cruising Club currently own the John Sebastian Light Vessel and host regular events at the venue.

The Lightship Theatre 
Cabot Cruising Club's The Lightship Theatre is an arts venue in Bristol that hosts theatre and other arts events.

They have hosted events such as The Lightship Arts Festival, along with hosting theatre companies such as Flying Chairs and Instant Wit.

References 

Lightships of the United Kingdom